Cabezo de Altomira is a mountain located about 4 km NE of the town of Alfamén, Campo de Cariñena comarca, Aragon, Spain. 

The Cabezo de Altomira offers an excellent lookout point over the surrounding plain of Cariñena and the Sierra de Algairén and Sierra de Vicort ranges further to the south. 

There are ruins of an ancient Iberian settlement in the hill that have been excavated recently.

See also
Alfamén
Campo de Cariñena

References

External links
Cabezo Altomira. Alfamén, Guía Práctica

Mountains of Aragon